Old Cayman Sign Language is, or was, the deaf sign language of Grand Cayman in the Cayman Islands.  It may be related to Providencia Sign Language.

References

Village sign languages
Languages of the Cayman Islands